West Yueliangdao station is an interchange station on Line 4 and Line 10 of the Changsha subway, operated by the operator Changsha Metro.

Station layout
The station has one island platform. It has four entrances.

History
The station opened on 26 May 2019.

Surrounding area
 High School Affiliated to Hunan Normal University
 The Moon Island

References

Railway stations in Hunan
Railway stations in China opened in 2019